Lindsay Davenport was the defending champion but lost in the final 5–7, 7–5, 6–4 against Monica Seles.

Seeds
A champion seed is indicated in bold text while text in italics indicates the round in which that seed was eliminated. The top four seeds received a bye to the second round.

  Martina Hingis (semifinals)
  Monica Seles (champion)
  Amanda Coetzer (second round)
  Lindsay Davenport (final)
  Arantxa Sánchez Vicario (quarterfinals)
  Anke Huber (quarterfinals)
  Irina Spîrlea (first round)
  Kimberly Po (second round)

Draw

Final

Section 1

Section 2

External links
 1997 Acura Classic Draw

LA Women's Tennis Championships
1997 WTA Tour